Frédéric Alexandre "Fred" Leclercq (born 23 June 1978) is a French musician and producer, best known as the former longtime bassist for British power metal band DragonForce. He is currently the guitarist and main songwriter in the death metal supergroup Sinsaenum, the guitarist and vocalist in Maladaptive, the bassist and a guitarist in Amahiru, and the bassist of German thrash metal group Kreator and French death metal band Loudblast. He is a session musician for various other bands, including George Lynch's Souls of We. He is also a former member of power metal band Heavenly and played several shows with Carnival in Coal and Sabaton.

Playing influences
Leclercq is influenced by various guitarists such as Uli Jon Roth, Adrian Smith, Trey Azagthoth, and Marty Friedman.

Career 
In 2005 Leclercq joined Dragonforce as a replacement to Adrian Lambert on the Sonic Firestorm tour.  He released 7 albums with the band.  He later parted with the band due to wanting to pursue other types of music on his own.  Guitarist Herman Li once said," I didn't want to get Fred because he is such a phenomenal guitarist."

On 16 September 2019, Kreator announced that Leclercq would replace Christian Giesler on Bass after having spent 25 years with the band.

In 2020, Leclercq formed the musical project Amahiru with Japanese guitarist Saki. Saki performs lead guitar, while Leclercq plays lead, rhythm and bass guitar. The two first met in 2015 when Saki's band, Mary's Blood, opened for DragonForce in Hong Kong. Amahiru's self-titled debut album was released on 27 November 2020, and features British vocalist Archie Wilson, Dutch keyboardist Coen Janssen, and American drummer Mike Heller. It also features shakuhachi player Kifu Mitsuhashi, and guest performances by Elize Ryd and Sean Reinert.

Equipment
Leclercq uses ESP bass guitars and has a signature model, the LTD FL-600, with five other bassists (the others being Gabe Crisp, Frank Bello, Pancho Tomaselli, Tom Araya and Henkka Seppälä). He uses ESP ARROW FL SIN-6B and ANTELOPE custom baritone scale models for Sinsaenum. Whilst performing in Sabaton, he used an ESP horizon electric guitar. For amplification, he uses Peavey Tour 700 bass amps and 8x10 bass cabinets, along with a Samson UHF Wireless System.

Notable bands and projects
Hors Normes (fusion) 1994–1996; 2000
Memoria (black metal) 1997–1999; 2000–2001
Heavenly (power metal) 2000–2004
DragonForce (power metal) 2005–2019
Sinsaenum (blackened death metal) 2016–present
Kreator (thrash metal) 2019–present
Amahiru (heavy metal/hard rock) 2020–present

References

External links 

Sinsaenum
DragonForce
Maladaptive

DragonForce members
French heavy metal bass guitarists
Male bass guitarists
1978 births
Living people
21st-century bass guitarists
Sinsaenum members
French male guitarists